Siege of Rheinberg may refer to:
 Siege of Rheinberg (1586–90), Spanish victory
 Siege of Rheinberg (1597), Dutch victory
 Siege of Rheinberg (1598), Spanish victory
 Siege of Rheinberg (1601), Dutch victory
 Siege of Rheinberg (1606), Spanish victory
 Siege of Rheinberg (1633), Dutch victory